Kozlany may refer to places in the Czech Republic:

Kozlany (Třebíč District), a municipality and village in the Vysočina Region
Kozlany (Vyškov District), a municipality and village in the South Moravian Region